Greek National Road 22 is a national highway of Greece. It connects Kakavia, on the border with Albania, with Kalpaki. It's a part of European route E853.

22
Roads in Epirus (region)